The first USS Volunteer was a 209-ton steamer captured  by the Union Navy and put to use by the Union during the American Civil War.

Virginia served the Navy in minor roles: as a dispatch boat and tugboat; however, at times, she would also be assigned as a patrolling gunboat.

Captured by Union Navy forces 

Volunteer—originally a Confederate steamer captured off Natchez Island, Mississippi, by Fort Hindman on 25 November 1863—was purchased by the Navy from the Springfield, Illinois, prize court on 29 February 1864.

Civil War Union Navy service 
 
Volunteer was assigned to the Mississippi Squadron and performed valuable service as a patrol, dispatch, and tow steamer.

Her one major engagement during the war occurred on 14 April 1864 when she helped to drive off a Confederate force which was attacking Fort Pillow, Tennessee.

Post-war service 

After the end of the war in April 1865, Volunteer convoyed naval stores up and down the Mississippi River as Union naval forces in the West deactivated.

Decommissioning 

That summer, she was decommissioned and laid up at Mound City, Illinois, and was sold at public auction there to B. F. Goodwin on 29 November.

See also

Confederate States Navy
Anaconda Plan

References 

Ships of the Union Navy
Steamships of the United States Navy
Dispatch boats of the United States Navy
Tugs of the United States Navy
Gunboats of the United States Navy
American Civil War patrol vessels of the United States